Vassiliki Kalogera is a Greek astrophysicist. She is a professor at Northwestern University and the Director of the Center for Interdisciplinary Exploration and Research in Astrophysics (CIERA). She is a leading member of the LIGO Collaboration that observed gravitational waves in 2015.

Kalogera is a leading theorist in the study of gravitational waves, the emission of X-rays from compact binary objects and the coalescence of neutron-star binaries.

Early life and education
Kalogera was born in 1971 in Serres, Greece. She received her B.S. degree in physics in 1992 from the University of Thessaloniki. She attended the University of Illinois at Urbana–Champaign for graduate school, where she completed her PhD in astronomy in 1997. She joined the Center for Astrophysics  Harvard & Smithsonian as a CfA postdoctoral fellow and was awarded the Clay Fellowship in 2000. She joined the faculty in the Department of Physics and Astronomy at Northwestern University in 2001.

Career and research
Kalogera is the Daniel I. Linzer Distinguished University Professor at Northwestern University. She serves as the Director of the Center for Interdisciplinary Exploration and Research in Astrophysics (CIERA). Her current research covers a range a topics in theoretical astrophysics, including the study of gravitational waves detected by LIGO, the development of models for X-ray binaries, LSST, and predicting the progenitors of supernovae.

Awards and honors

 Legacy Fellow, American Astronomical Society, 2020
 Crain's Chicago Business Notable Women in STEM, 2020
 Elected Fellow, American Association for the Advancement of Science, 2019
 Elected Member, US National Academy of Sciences, 2018
 Dannie Heineman Prize for Astrophysics, 2018. The award, administered by the American Institute of Physics and the American Astronomical Society, cites Kalogera's "fundamental contributions to advancing our understanding of the evolution and fate of compact objects in binary systems, with particular regard to their electromagnetic and gravitational wave signals."
 Senior Fellow (2017–2021), CIFAR, Gravity and the Extreme Universe Program, 2017
 Martin E. and Gertrude G. Walder Award for Research Excellence, Northwestern University, 2017
 Hans A. Bethe Prize, 2016. The award, administered by the American Physical Society, cites Kalogera's "key contributions to the study of the electromagnetic and gravitational wave radiation from binary compact objects, including the now-verified prediction that neutron star mergers produce short gamma-ray bursts that will be found in all galaxy types."
 Simons Foundation Fellow in Theoretical Astrophysics, 2012
 Kavli Fellow, Kavli Frontiers of Science German-American Symposium, National Academy of Sciences, 2009
 Fellow, American Physical Society, 2008. Nominated by the Division of Astrophysics for "fundamental contributions to understanding the structure, formation and evolution of compact objects in binary systems, using X-ray and radio observations to study their importance for gravitational wave detectors."
 Maria Goeppert-Mayer Award, American Physical Society, 2008
 Selected as one of Astronomy Magazine's "10 Rising Stars of Astronomy", 2008
 National Science Foundation Faculty Early Career Development Program (CAREER) Award in Astronomy, Theoretical Studies of Compact Objects in Binary Systems, 2005
 Cottrell Scholar Award, Research Corporation for Science Advancement, 2004
 Annie Jump Cannon Award, American Astronomical Society, for outstanding research and promise for future research by a postdoctoral woman researcher, 2002
 Packard Fellowship for Science and Engineering, David and Lucile Packard Foundation, 2002

References

Living people
People from Serres
Greek women scientists
21st-century Greek astronomers
Greek astrophysicists
20th-century Greek astronomers
Women astrophysicists
21st-century American women scientists
Aristotle University of Thessaloniki alumni
University of Illinois Urbana-Champaign alumni
Northwestern University faculty
Members of the United States National Academy of Sciences
Winners of the Dannie Heineman Prize for Astrophysics
Recipients of the Annie J. Cannon Award in Astronomy
Fellows of the American Astronomical Society
1971 births
American women academics